
Year 553 (DLIII) was a common year starting on Wednesday (link will display the full calendar) of the Julian calendar. The denomination 553 for this year has been used since the early medieval period, when the Anno Domini calendar era became the prevalent method in Europe for naming years.

Events 
 By place 
 Byzantine Empire 
 Battle of Mons Lactarius: King Teia secretly marches to join forces with his brother Aligern in Campania, to relieve the siege of Cumae. Meanwhile at Mons Lactarius (modern Monti Lattari), Narses lays an ambush. The combined Gothic force is crushed in a hopeless last stand for two days (south of Naples), and Teia is killed in the fighting. Aligern escapes, but surrenders a few months later.
 The Ostrogothic Kingdom ends after 60 years of rule in Italy. The Goths are allowed to return to their homes in peace and (re)settle in modern-day Austria. Some 7,000 people retreat to Campsas (Southern Gaul), and resist with minimal help from the Franks against the Byzantines until 554.
 The Byzantines retreated from Telephis–Ollaria.

 Europe 
 Gothic War: Frankish invasion — Two Frankish-Alemanni dukes, brothers Lothair and Buccelin, cross the Alps from Germany with a force of 75,000 men, mostly Frankish infantry. In the Po Valley, they win an easy victory over a much smaller Byzantine force at Parma, and are joined by remnants of the Gothic armies, bringing the total strength of the invaders to about 90,000 men. Narses, gathering his forces as quickly as possible, marches north to harass the Franks, but is not strong enough to engage them in battle. In Samnium (Southern Italy) the brothers divide their forces: Lothaire goes down the east coast, then returns to the north, to winter in the Po Valley. Buccelin follows the west coast into Calabria, where he spends the winter — his army being seriously wasted by attrition and disease.

 Asia 
 King Seong of Baekje attacks the kingdoms of Goguryeo and Silla. However, under a secret agreement, Silla troops attack the exhausted Baekje army, and take possession of the entire Han River valley. 
 In the Turkic Khaganate Istemi is appointed governor (yabgu) in the west of the empire (modern Turkestan), and Muqan Qaghan succeeds his brother Issik Qaghan as emperor (khagan) of the Göktürks.

 By topic 
 Religion 
 May 5 – The Fifth Ecumenical Council is held in Constantinople. In an edict, Emperor Justinian I condemns the Three Chapters, causing further schisms and heresies of monoenergism and monothelitism.

Births 
 December 10 – Houzhu, emperor of the Chen dynasty (d. 604)

Deaths 
 August 5 – Xiao Ji, prince of the Liang dynasty (b. 508)
exact date unknown
Gelimer, king of the Vandals and Alans (b. 480) 
Issik Qaghan, ruler of the Turkic Khaganate
Teia, king of the Ostrogoths

References